An underground film is a film that is out of the mainstream either in its style, genre or financing.

Notable examples include:
John Waters' Pink Flamingos,
David Lynch's Eraserhead, 
Andy Warhol's Blue Movie,
Rosa von Praunheim's Tally Brown, New York,
Frank Henenlotter's Basket Case,
Nikos Nikolaidis' Singapore Sling, 
Rinse Dreams' Café Flesh, and
Jörg Buttgereit's Nekromantik.

Definition and history
The first printed use of the term "underground film" occurs in a 1957 essay by American film critic Manny Farber, "Underground Films." Farber uses it to refer to the work of directors who "played an anti-art role in Hollywood." He contrasts "such soldier-cowboy-gangster directors as Raoul Walsh, Howard Hawks, William Wellman," and others with the "less talented De Sicas and Zinnemanns [who] continue to fascinate the critics." However, as in "Underground Press", the term developed as a metaphorical reference to a clandestine and subversive culture beneath the legitimate and official media.

In the late 1950s, "underground film" began to be used to describe early independent film makers operating first in San Francisco, California and New York City, New York, and soon in other cities around the world as well, including the London Film-Makers' Co-op in Britain and Ubu Films in Sydney, Australia. The movement was typified by more experimental filmmakers working at the time like Shirley Clarke, Stan Brakhage, Harry Everett Smith, Maya Deren, Andy Warhol, Kenneth Anger, Jonas Mekas, Ken Jacobs, Ron Rice, Jack Smith, George and Mike Kuchar, and Bruce Conner.

By the late 1960s, the movement represented by these filmmakers had matured, and some began to distance themselves from the countercultural, psychedelic connotations of the word, preferring terms like avant-garde or experimental to describe their work.

Through 1970s and 1980s, however, "underground film" would still be used to refer to the more countercultural fringe of independent cinema. The term was embraced most emphatically by Nick Zedd and the other filmmakers associated with the New York-based Cinema of Transgression and No Wave Cinema of the late 1970s to early 1990s.

Latter-day cinema
In the early 1990s, the legacy of the Cinema of Transgression carried over into a new generation, who would equate "underground cinema" with transgressive art, ultra-low-budget filmmaking created in defiance of both the commercialized versions of independent film offered by newly wealthy distributors like Miramax and New Line, as well as the institutionalized experimental film canonized at major museums. This spirit defined the early years of underground film festivals (like the New York Underground Film Festival, Chicago Underground Film Festival, Boston Underground Film Festival, Sydney Underground Film Festival, Hamilton Underground Film Festival, Toronto's Images Festival, and others), zines like Film Threat, as well as the works of filmmakers like Craig Baldwin, Jon Moritsugu, Carlos Atanes, Johnny Terris, Sarah Jacobson, and Bruce La Bruce. In London the Underground resurgence emerged as a movement of Underground cinema clubs which included the radical open access group the Exploding Cinema.

By the late 1990s and early 2000s, the term had become blurred again, as the work at underground festivals began to blend with more formal experimentation, and the divisions that had been stark ones less than a decade earlier now seemed much less so. If the term is used at all, it connotes a form of very low budget independent filmmaking, with perhaps transgressive content, or a lo-fi analog to post-punk music and cultures.

A recent development in underground filmmaking can be observed through the Lower East Side based film production company ASS Studios. Founded in 2011 by writer Reverend Jen and filmmaker Courtney Fathom Sell, the group avoided most modern methods of production, choosing to shoot all of their work on an outdated Hi 8 format and usually with no-budget. Utilizing many New York based performers, their work generally contained camp elements and taboo themes. These films were commonly screened at venues & bars in and around New York City.

Underground versus cult
The term "underground film" is occasionally used as a synonym for cult film (as in the case of films like Eating Raoul). Though there are important distinctions between the two, a significant overlap between these categories is undeniable. The films of Kenneth Anger, for example, could arguably be described as underground while a studio film like Heathers (New World Pictures) may have a cult following, but could not be accurately described as an underground film.

Criticism
Film critic Pauline Kael called most underground cinema "a creature of publicity and mutual congratulations on artistry".

Notable underground cinema figures
List is incomplete.

Usama Alshaibi
Kenneth Anger
Gregg Araki
Carlos Atanes
Michel Auder
Scott Barley
Carmelo Bene
Jean-Pierre Bouyxou
Stan Brakhage 
Jörg Buttgereit
Pierre Clémenti
Bruce Conner
Tony Conrad 
Shirley Clarke 
Storm de Hirsch 
Maya Deren
Marian Dora
Robert Downey, Sr.
Rinse Dream
Stephen Dwoskin
Dustin Ferguson
James Fotopoulos
Hollis Frampton
Dmitrii Frolov
Curtis Harrington
Ian Hugo 
Straub-Huillet
Ken Jacobs
Sarah Jacobson
Richard Kern
Peter Kubelka 
George Kuchar
Gregory Markopoulos 
Jonas Mekas 
Marie Menken 
Annette Michelson
Jon Moritsugu
Otto Muehl
Paul Morrissey
Gunvor Nelson
Nikos Nikolaidis
Damon Packard
Luther Price
Yvonne Rainer
Jesse Richards
Peter Rinaldi
Jacques Rivette
Carolee Schneeman
Paul Sharits
P. Adams Sitney
Michael Snow 
Chick Strand
Chester Novell Turner
Stan Vanderbeek 
Agustí Villaronga
Andy Warhol
John Waters
Nicholas Watson
Nick Zedd
Thierry Zéno

Further reading
Wheeler Winston Dixon, The Exploding Eye: A Re-Visionary History of 1960s American Experimental Cinema, Albany: SUNY UP, 1998.
Sheldon Renan,	An introduction to the American underground film, New York : Dutton, 1967
Jack Sargeant, Naked Lens: Beat Cinema, London : Creation Books, 1997, 1999.
Jack Sargeant, Deathtripping: The Cinema of Transgression, London : Creation Books, 1995, 2000.
P Adams Sitney, Visionary Film: The American Avant Garde 1943 - 1978, Galaxy Books, 1979
Jack Stevenson, Desperate Visions: Camp America; London : Creation Books, 1996
Duncan Reekie,  Subversion: The Definitive History of Underground Cinema ; London : Wallflower Press 2007.

See also

Microcinema
No Wave Cinema
Experimental film
Remodernist film
Cinema of Transgression
Grupo Cine Liberación, an Argentine film movement
No budget film
Chicago Underground Film Festival
New York Underground Film Festival
Lausanne Underground Film and Music Festival
Boston Underground Film Festival
New Haven Underground Film Festival
Hamilton Underground Film Festival
Anthology Film Archives

References

External links

Underground Film Journal

Film genres
Underground culture
Experimental film
Avant-garde art
1950s in film
1960s in film
1970s in film
1980s in film
1990s in film
2000s in film
2010s in film

it:New American Cinema